Oper may refer to:

Technology
 Operator (disambiguation)
 IRC operator
Outstanding Physical Education Preparation, a website for PE preparation

Opera
 Deutsche Oper Berlin, Oper Leipzig, Komische Oper Berlin, Alte Oper
 Romantische Oper, genre of German opera

Surname
 Andres Oper, Estonian football player

Mathematics
 Oper (mathematics) (as defined by Alexander Beilinson and Vladimir Drinfeld), a mathematical bundle on a punctured disc, equipped with a flat connection and an additional extra structure, called the "oper structure"